Crosstalk is a 1982 science fiction thriller film made in Australia and produced by the New South Wales Film Corporation. Directed by Mark Egerton and starring Gary Day, the film's story bears a resemblance to Rear Window.

Plot
Ed Ballinger is an engineer who uses a wheelchair and is developing a computer system with artificial intelligence called the I-500. After moving into an apartment complex, Ed thinks he witnessed a murder in a neighbouring building.

Cast
Gary Day as Ballinger
Penny Downie as Cindy
John Ewart as David Stollier
Kim Deacon as Jane
Peter Collingwood as Hollister

Production
In 1979 Keith Salvat, who had made the film Private Collection (1972), wrote a script inspired by Rear Window (1954) called High Rise, about a man trapped in a high rise building because of an injury. He received from development money from the New South Wales Film Corporation and wrote early drafts with the assistance of Byron Kennedy. Then Ross Matthews became involved as producer, and the NSWFC agreed to finance the entire movie themselves under the title Wall to Wall...

Just before filming commenced Ross Matthews got another film funded, Hoodwink (1981) and so brought in Errol Sullivan as co-producer. Filming began in 1981 and was marked by difficulties and tensions, particularly between Sullivan and Salvat. Salvat shot for 19 days, then on 31 May 1981 Sullivan and Matthews fired Salvat and replaced him with first assistant director Mark Egerton. Production was shut down for a week while Egerton and Denis Whitburn rewrote the script. Among the changes made were a new opening sequence and removing most of the exteriors so more scenes could be shot in the one set.

Salvat requested that his name be taken off the film and that the title be changed. Errol Sullivan claims that only one or two scenes remain in the final film.

Reception
Filmink magazine said "It’s a film best remembered for the fact that the director was sacked during production."

Box office
Crosstalk grossed $26,000 at the box office in Australia.

Home media

See also
Cinema of Australia

References

External links
Crosstalk at Internet Movie Database
Crosstalk at Oz Movies

1982 films
1980s science fiction thriller films
Australian science fiction thriller films
Films scored by Chris Neal (songwriter)
1980s English-language films
1980s Australian films